Pakistan–Tunisia relations refer to bilateral relations between Pakistan and Tunisia. A number of framework agreements have been concluded between Pakistan and Tunisia in the spheres of trade, tourism, culture, information and industries. Both countries are members of the Organisation of Islamic Cooperation.

Diplomatic Missions
Diplomatic relations between both states were established in 1957. Pakistan opened its embassy in Tunis in 1958 at the Charges d' Affaires level which was later upgraded to that of Ambassador/Plenipotentiary in 1964. Tunisia introduced its embassy in Islamabad in 1980.

History

Pakistan supported Tunisia during its struggle for independence. Members of that generation who are still living fondly recall Pakistan's steadfastness for backing Tunisia's liberation movement. Between 1948 and 1954, Pakistan's first Foreign Minister, Sir Zafarullah Khan, represented Pakistan at the United Nations Security Council where he vociferously advocated for Tunisian freedom from colonial rule.

So were the contributions of renowned writer and diplomat, Patras Bokhari, lauded by the Tunisian government for his defence of Tunisian independence. During his tenure as Pakistan's Permanent Representative at the United Nations from 1951 to 1954, he delivered an epic speech on the floor of the Security Council for which a road was named after him by Tunisia right after its independence in 1956.

For its part, Tunisia has backed Pakistan in the Kashmir conflict but insomuch that it does not antagonize India, with whom it has fostered significant trade relations.

Bilateral relations
There exists also a long tradition of collaboration between the two countries in international organizations particularly at the United Nations, the OIC and NAM in terms of lending support to each other's stance and candidatures . Pakistan backed Tunisia on the issue of its complete control over Bizerte which the French colonial rulers eventually evacuated in 1960.

In the context of bilateral interaction at VVIP level, Pakistani Prime Minister Zulfikar Ali Bhutto visited in January 1972. while Prime Minister Benazir Bhutto; and, Nawaz Sharif - also in his capacity as Prime Minister - toured Tunisia in May 1990 and February 1991 respectively. The last bilateral VVIP tour occurred when Pakistani President, Pervez Musharraf, was invited to Tunisia in July 2003. On the other hand, no VVIP tour has materialized from Tunisia although leaders of both nations interact at multilateral fora. Tunisian Foreign Minister Habib Chatty represented his country at the Second OIC Summit which was organized in Lahore in February 1974.

Small diasporas totalling hardly 100 individuals is a prominent aspect taken for both countries combined. In addition, student exchange is non-existent; nevertheless, madrassa-affiliated participants and tablighi missionaries visit Pakistan for annual jamaats. At this current juncture and in keeping with contemporary times, the general state of ties can be reconfigured to focus chiefly on trade and security.

In 2005, when a deadly Earthquake struck the Muzaffarabad region of Pakistan, Tunisia sent a C-130 carrying 14 tons of relief supplies, including food, blankets and medical supplies to Pakistan.

In 2011 and 2014, Tunisia played host to Pakistani refugees fleeing the violence in neighboring Libya. This gesture has become a prominent feature of bilateral ties.

A friendship group exists between Pakistan's National Assembly and Tunisia's Assembly of People's Representatives. Upon the invitation of Pakistan's Jamaat-i-Islami, Ennahdha members visited Pakistan in 2014.

On 27 October 2015, Pakistan feted the Tunisian Envoy in Islamabad in recognition of 4 Tunisian civil society organizations being awarded the Nobel Peace Prize.

There have been proposals from both nations that Islamabad & Tunis and Karachi & Sfax be designated as twin cities. A visa abolition agreement was inked in 2010 which is restricted to diplomatic and official passport holders.

In terms of collaboration at the United Nations, both countries occasionally support each other's candidatures at several UN-affiliated agencies. This is premised on the principle of reciprocity and in the recent past, this has been witnessed by mutual backing or withdrawal from the electoral race in favour of the other during rounds of voting.

Bilateral Political Consultations
Two sessions of this bilateral mechanism have been organized thus far, the last one in September 2012 during the 8th Joint Ministerial Commission (JMC) in Islamabad.

Educational Research & Exchanges

Collaboration between universities is minimal. In 2008, faculty members of 2 Pakistani educational institutions visited Tunisia. However, student exchange is non-existent, perhaps given the difference in the medium of instruction being used in either country - Pakistan utilises English while in Tunisia it is primarily Arabic and French. Nevertheless, a couple of accords have been signed between Tunisia's Ezzeitouna University and Pakistan's International Islamic University (2012) as well as the University of Tunis al-Manar and COMSATS Institute of Information Technology (2015), also known by its acronym CIIT, in Pakistan.

In 1998, Pakistani scholars obtained their doctorates in Islamic Fiqh from Tunisia whereas a few Tunisian students have been imparted religious education at Pakistani madrassas. In addition, a MoU for Cooperation between the Foreign Service Academy of Pakistan and Tunisia's Diplomatic Training Institute (2002) exists. Interaction here is also quite limited.

Cultural Links

Tunisia's national television network had extended an invitation to Sufi singers from Pakistan in 2012 to perform during the month of Ramadan. Consequently, a troupe of Sufi singers led by Fakir Jamaluddin was invited. The troupe rendered performances not only on television but also at five other locations including the capital Tunis.

The Nusrat Fateh Ali participated at the 1994 Carthage International Music Festival in Tunis. The singer Abida Parveen also performed at the festival. On a more recent note in July 2015, Qawwal Faiz Ali Faiz attended the same event as part of a duet.

Potential exists for the introduction of Pakistani soap operas on Tunisian television networks, of course, dubbed in the local language. In the context of landmarks, Pakistan Street and Islamabad Street have been designated by the Tunisian government as a reminder of the bilateral goodwill prevalent between the two countries.

Defence Collaboration

The sphere of defence cooperation is currently punctuated by study tours undertaken by Pakistan's National Defence University (NDU) as well as naval delegations, whereas, no visit has yet transpired from Tunisia. In August 1996 and May 2005, vessels belonging to Pakistan Navy made port calls in Tunis. Since 2012, training of military personnel and exchange of experiences has been the focus of policy makers in both nations. In addition, Tunisia has evinced interest in Pakistani-made small arms, combat/protection gear and ammunition. Given the mutual experience with the fight against terrorism, prospects exist for cooperation in security & counter-terrorism.

Parliamentary Friendship Groups

Respective parliamentary friendship groups have been created in each country to ensure bilateral interaction between the elected representatives. The last visits/exchanges were recorded in:
1977= Pakistani parliamentarians in Tunisia
1991= Tunisian parliamentarians in Pakistan

Pakistan-Tunisia Friendship Association
This forum has been in existence since the mid-70s and is mandated with increasing bilateral goodwill and affinity through cultural, trade and social interaction.

References

See also 
 Foreign relations of Pakistan
 Foreign relations of Tunisia

 
Tunisia
Bilateral relations of Tunisia
Tunisia